Jordan Owens may refer to:

Jordan Owens (footballer) (born 1989), footballer from Northern Ireland 
Jordan Owens (ice hockey) (born 1986). Canadian ice hockey player